The Mönch (German: "monk") at  is a mountain in the Bernese Alps, in Switzerland. Together with the Eiger and the Jungfrau, it forms a highly recognisable group of mountains, visible from far away.

The Mönch lies on the border between the cantons of Valais and Bern, and forms part of a mountain ridge between the Jungfrau and Jungfraujoch to the west, and the Eiger to the east. The north side of the Mönch forms a step wall above the Lauterbrunnen valley.

The summit was first climbed on record on 15 August 1857 by Christian Almer, Christian Kaufmann (1831-1861), Ulrich Kaufmann and Sigismund Porges.

Gallery

See also

List of 4000 metre peaks of the Alps

References

External links

 Mönch on Summitpost
 Mönch on Hikr
  - photos
 Mönch from Kleine Scheidegg

Alpine four-thousanders
Mountains of the Alps
Mountains of Switzerland
Bernese Alps
Mountains of Valais
Mountains of the canton of Bern
Bern–Valais border
Four-thousanders of Switzerland